A food column is a type of newspaper column dealing with food.  It may be focused on recipes, health trends, or improving efficiency.  It is generally geared towards gourmets or "foodies". Since 1994, food writers have also written columns and blogs on the web. Kate Heyhoe's Internet column first appeared on the electronic Gourmet Guide in December 1994 and became the centerpiece of its own website, The Global Gourmet, in 1996, making her one of the longest, continuously-running food blogger/columnists on the web.

Food columnists in the English-speaking world
Some food columnists of note include:
Julia Child
Craig Claiborne
John T. Edge
Kate Heyhoe
Judith Huxley
Christopher Kimball
Sheila Lukins
Wolfgang Puck (Wolfgang Puck’s Kitchen)
Sylvia Schur
Ruth Ellen Church

See also
Culinary Arts
Food porn

References

Newspaper content